The Théâtre de Quat'Sous is a Canadian theatre on Pine Avenue in the borough of Le Plateau-Mont-Royal in the city of Montreal, Quebec. Established in 1955, it is the third-oldest theatre company in Montreal after Théâtre du Rideau Vert and Théâtre du Nouveau Monde. The first Canadian play about and starring a drag queen, Hosanna by Michel Tremblay, was first performed at Théâtre de Quat'Sous in 1973.

External links

References

Theatres in Montreal
Theatres completed in 2009
Theatre de Quat Sous
Theatre de Quat Sous
1955 establishments in Quebec